The Esperanto Association of Britain (EAB) is a registered educational charity whose objective is to advance education in and about the international language Esperanto and to preserve and promote the culture and heritage of Esperanto for the educational benefit of the general public. The organisation was established in 1904.

Among its activities it publishes, provides and distributes information about the language and organises educational courses, lectures and conferences. It also provides a comprehensive bookshop with material from around the world.

Publications

In January 1905, the British Esperanto Association launched its official organ, The British Esperantist. as a monthly publication. The publication was retitled as La Brita Esperantisto (and for a short while LBE for 2010 to 2014). The frequency of the publication varied. Initially it was a monthly and later on starting World War II as once every two months. It turned into a quarterly in 1991, then semi-annually with two issues (Autumn and Spring). 

Other regular publications include Update (a newsletter mainly in English with news of activities related to the language).

Offices
In earlier years, the offices of EAB were located at 17 Hart Street, London WC1, then 140 Holland Park Avenue, London W11. However, in April 2001, due to the cost of maintaining the building, the offices were relocated to a converted outbuilding at the Wedgwood Memorial College, Barlaston, Staffordshire, where they remain today, and where one of the largest and most important collections of material in and about Esperanto is to be found in the Montagu Butler Library.

See also
Junularo Esperantista Brita Young British Esperantists

References

External links
 Esperanto Association of Britain website 
Junularo Esperantista Brita (JEB) Website

Britain
Educational organisations based in the United Kingdom
1904 establishments in the United Kingdom
Organizations established in 1904
Esperanto in the United Kingdom